Samuel Wilfred McDonough (8 October 1899 – 19 May 1983) was an Irish cricketer.  McDonough was a right-handed batsman who occasionally fielded as a wicket-keeper.  He was born at Armagh was educated at The Royal School, Armagh.

Following success in club cricket for Armagh, McDonough was selected to play in Ireland's first-class match against Scotland in 1930.  The Irish batsman struggled in this match against the Scottish fast bowler Arthur Baxter, though opening the batting McDonough himself scored 13 runs in the Irish first-innings before falling victim to Baxter, while in their second-innings he top scored with 48 before Stuart Hiddleston.

Outside of cricket he was employed as a Gas Company Manager, then as a school bursar.  He died at Bangor, Northern Ireland on 19 May 1983.

References

External links
Wilfred McDonough at ESPNcricinfo
Wilfred McDonough at CricketArchive

1899 births
1983 deaths
People from Armagh (city)
People educated at The Royal School, Armagh
Irish cricketers
Cricketers from Northern Ireland
Sportspeople from County Armagh
Wicket-keepers